Beirut Art Center is a space for exhibiting contemporary art in Beirut, Lebanon

History 
Beirut Art Center opened to public in January 2009. It is managed as a non-profit organization whose founders and executive board members were Sandra Dagher, Lamia Joreige, Nathalie Khoury, Rabih Mroué and Maria Ousseimi  The project roots in the growing interest to local contemporary art. It was an initiative of Sandra Dagher, who previously curated a private art space, Espace SD, and Lamia Joreige, visual artist. In 2007, Sandra Dagher curated with Saleh Barakat, owner of Agial Art Gallery in Beirut, the first Lebanese Pavilion at the Venice Biennale.

In 2011, New York City's New Museum hosted “Museum as Hub: Beirut Art Center” a project that includes an exhibition, the presentation of Beirut Art Center’s Médiathèque, and a series of events.

After co-founders Sandra Dagher and Lamia Joreige have been in charge of the BAC for five years, Marie Muracciole was appointed in February 2014 to take its direction for a five-years mandate. In 2019, Rana Nasser-Eddin was named administrative director and two artists, Haig Aivazian and Ahmad Ghossein were appointed artistic directors. In January 2023, Reem Shadid was appointed as director.

Building 
The BAC opened in Jisr el Wati, an industrial area on the banks of Beirut River. The building was refurbished by architect Raed Abillama from a factory into a white cube space. The 1500 sq m space occupied 2 floors. The ground floor included the main exhibition space, a book store and an auditorium. The first floor included a secondary exhibition space, a médiathèque, a cafe with a terrasse, and the administrative offices. In 2019, Beirut Art Center moved into a new location, in the same neighborhood, occupying two floors in a warehouse building.

Exhibitions 

2019

 Home Works 8: I will return, and I will be millions
 Home Works 8: The distance between your eyes and the Sun (Charbel-joseph H. Boutros)
 Touché! (Gesture, Movement, Action) with Basel Abbas and Ruanne About Rahme, Majd Abdel Hamid, Francis Alÿs, George Awde, Yto Barrada, Mathilde Besson, Ismail Bahri, Manon de Boer, Tacita Dean, Ali Eyal, Omar Fakhoury, Hiba Farhat, Ghida Hachicho, Mona Hatoum, Ana Jotta, Hassan Khan, Nesrine Khodr, Joachim Koester, Arthur Ligeon, Pierre Leguillon, Mathilde Lequenne, Dala Nasser, Roman Signer, Rania Stephan (curated by Marie Muracciole and C Wavelet)
 How to Reappear: through the Quivering Leaves of Independent Publishing

2018

 Of Words and Stones. Zineb Sedira, (curated by Marie Muracciole)
 Things That Shine and Things That Are Dark. Joachim Koester (curated by Marie Muracciole)
 International Tourism (Staging Real Life). Marie Voignier (curated by Marie Muracciole)
 Slow Light. Daniele Genadry (curated by Marie Muracciole)
 Space Edits (The Trouble with Language), with Vito Acconci, Richard Artschwager, Nairy Baghramian, Janette Laverrière, Marcel Broodthaers, William S. Burroughs, Guy de Cointet, Robert Wilhite, Claude Closky, Baris Dogrusöz, Gheith Al Amine, Jean-Pascal Flavien, David Hammons, Iman Issa, Nesrine Khodr, Ali Meer, Pallavi Paul, Ieva Saudargaité Douaihi, Natascha Sadr Haghighian, Nicholas Bussmann, Roy Samaha (curated Marie Muracciole ) 
 Two Meetings and a Funeral. Naeem Mohaiemen 
 Knots'n Dust. Francis Alÿs (curated by Marie Muracciole)

2017

 Sharjah Biennial 13. Tamawuj: an unpredictable expression of human potential
 Photography at Work. Allan Sekula (curated by Marie Muracciole)
 Falling is not extending, Falling is collapsing, Marwa Arsianos,  (curated by Marie Muracciole)
 On Becoming Two, Tony Chakar,  (curated by Marie Muracciole).
 A Chapter of Synonyms, Rana ElNemr, (curated by Marie Muracciole). 

2016

 Exposure 8 - Metabolism with Monica Basbous Moukarzel, Mohamed Berro, Mochu, Bahar Noorizadeh, Núria Güell & Levi Orta, Anna Ogden-Smith, Rivers Plasketes, (curated by Marie Muracciole)
 The Portrait is an Address, Hassan Khan, exposition solo, (curated by Marie Muracciole) 
 Unravelled, (curated by Marie Muracciole and Rachel Dedman) with Majd Abdel Hamid, Mounira Al Solh, Yto Barrada, Taysir Batniji, Alighiero e Boetti, Michele Cohen, Janna Dyk, Mona Hatoum, Sheila Hicks, Annette Messager, Khalil Rabah, Karen Reimer, Nasri Sayegh, Laure Tixier, Raed Yassin, septembre-novembre. 
 Esma’/Listen, with Lawrence Abu Hamdan, Francis Alÿs, Vartan Avakian, Pauline Boudry and Renate Lorenz, Moyra Davey, Melissa Dubbin and Aaron Davidson, Pierre Huyghe, Alvin Lucier, Christian Marclay, Olaf Nicolai, Sharif Sehnaoui, Jessica Warboys, Cynthia Zaven (curated Marie Muracciole and Marcella Lista) .
 Landversation Beirut, Otobong Nkanga, (curated by Marie Muracciole). 

2015

 Exposure 7 – Mobility, with Yasmin Hage-Meany, Sandra Iché, Eshan Rafi, Mahmoud Safadi, Merve Unsal, (curated by Marie Muracciole).
 Aftercinema, with Kamal Aljafari, La Ribot, Jumana Manna, (curated by Marie Muracciole).
 Unfinished Conversation, around Stuart Hall with John Akomfrah, Penny Siopis, Zineb Sedira, (curated by Marie Muracciole).

2014

 Breath is a Sculpture. Giuseppe Penone
 Contre Nature. Kader Attia

 Meeting Points 7. Beirut: Ten Thousand Wiles and a Hundred Thousand Tricks
 Afteratlas

2013

 Video Vintage 1963 - 1983, from Centre Pompidou′s New Media Collection
 Groundwork. Jananne Al-Ani
 Now Here Then Elsewhere, Eric Baudelaire

2012
 Exposure 2012
 White Wall
 Khalil Rabah, review
 Gerhard Richter - Beirut
 Revolution vs. Revolution with Abbas, Vyacheslav Akhunov, Francis Alÿs, Hai Bo, Steven Cohen, Phil Collins, Tacita Dean, Fadi El Abdallah, David Goldblatt, Alfredo Jaar, William Kentridge, Marysia Lewandowska & Neil Cummings, Susan Meiselas, Boris Mikhailov

2011
 Exposure 2011
 The Beirut Experience
 Be...longing. Fouad Elkoury
 Image in the Aftermath
 Meeting Points 6. Locus Agonistes: Practices and Logics of the Civic
 IMAGE WORKS. Harun Farocki
 Drawing with the Things Themselves. Paola Yacoub

2010
 Par quatre chemins. Chris Marker
 Exposure 2010
 Witness Mona Hatoum
 Home Works 5
 Place at Last. Walid Sadek
 affiliations. Emily Jacir

2009
 America
 Earth of Endless Secrets. Writing for a Posterior Time. Akram Zaatari
 Prisoner Of War. Bernard Khoury
 The Road to Peace
 4
 Exposure 2009
 Closer

BAC Design 

BAC Design was a program dedicated to local industrial and product design.

2013
 Fly Bird Fly by Dar Onboz

2012
 Biomechania by Ranya Sarakbi
 Contemporary Perspectives in Middle Eastern Crafts. BAC design Exhibition by Carwan Gallery with Karen Chekerdjian, Khalid Shafar, Lindsey Adelman, Marc Baroud, Studio mischer'traxler, Nada Debs, Oeuffice, Paul Loebach, Philippe Malouin, Tamer Nakisci
 Street Art Bag by Sarah's Bag
 Pathways by Nada Zeineh
 Custom Miles by Azzi & Osta
 All that is reminiscent of her name by Krikor Jabotian
 The Creative Space

2011
 Beirut Rock Center. By Spockdesign - Karim Chaya
 Beirutkon. Anastasia Nysten, Carlo Massoud, Joelle Achkar, Marc Dibeh
 Seeds. A BAC design exhibition by Nathalie Khayat
 STARCH your summer. An exhibition by STARCH designers 2008-2009-2010
 The Order of Angels. by Hoda and Elias Baroudi
 Who's living on the 13th floor?. An Exhibition of Ceramics by Mary-Lynn Massoud and Racha Nawam
2010
 Capturing Culture. by Rana Salam

References

External links
 Website of Beirut Art Center

Education in Beirut
Museums in Beirut
Art museums and galleries in Lebanon
Arts organisations based in Lebanon
Non-profit organisations based in Lebanon
2009 establishments in Asia